Walter Palmer (16 July 1907–1985) was an English professional footballer who played as a centre forward. Although he was on the books of three clubs in the Football League, he only made one senior appearance, whilst playing for Southport who were in the Third Division (North) at the time.

References

1907 births
1985 deaths
Footballers from Sheffield
English footballers
Association football forwards
Leeds United F.C. players
Worksop Town F.C. players
Burnley F.C. players
Southport F.C. players
Shelbourne F.C. players
English Football League players